The 1964 USA Outdoor Track and Field Championships men's competition took place between June 26-28 at Rutgers Stadium in New Brunswick, New Jersey. The women's division held their championships separately at the new Hanford Bowl in Hanford, California.  The Hanford Bowl was one of the first stadiums to sport an all-weather track made of asphalt and rubber.  While this meet was separate from the Olympic Trials, since 1964 was an Olympic year, events were held over metric distances.

The Marathon championships were run in October at the Yonkers Marathon.

Results

Men track events

Men field events

Women track events

Women field events

See also
United States Olympic Trials (track and field)

References

 Results from T&FN
 results

USA Outdoor Track and Field Championships
Usa Outdoor Track And Field Championships, 1964
Track and field
Track and field in California
USA Outdoor Track and Field Championships
Sports competitions in California
Track and field in New Jersey
USA Outdoor Track and Field Championships
USA Outdoor Track and Field Championships
Sports in New Brunswick, New Jersey